Mike Condon may refer to:

Mike Condon (ice hockey) (born 1990), American ice hockey goaltender
Michael Condon (1919–1960), Welsh rugby footballer